Tulsita is a census-designated place (CDP) in Bee County, Texas, United States. The population was 14 at the 2010 census.

Geography
U.S. Route 181 passes through the community, leading south  to Beeville, which is the county seat, and north  to Kenedy.

Demographics
As of the census of 2000, there were 20 people, 8 households, and 6 families residing in the CDP. The population density was 10.0 people per square mile (3.9/km2). There were 15 housing units at an average density of 7.5/sq mi (2.9/km2). The racial makeup of the CDP was 75.00% White, 20.00% from other races, and 5.00% from two or more races. Hispanic or Latino of any race were 40.00% of the population.

There were 8 households, out of which 37.5% had children under the age of 18 living with them, 37.5% were married couples living together, 25.0% had a female householder with no husband present, and 25.0% were non-families. 12.5% of all households were made up of individuals, and 12.5% had someone living alone who was 65 years of age or older. The average household size was 2.50 and the average family size was 2.83.

In the CDP, the population was spread out, with 40.0% under the age of 18, 20.0% from 25 to 44, 30.0% from 45 to 64, and 10.0% who were 65 years of age or older. The median age was 34 years. For every 100 females, there were 81.8 males. For every 100 females age 18 and over, there were 71.4 males.

The median income for a household in the CDP was $16,250, and the median income for a family was $23,125. Males had a median income of $24,063 versus $0 for females. The per capita income for the CDP was $7,412. There are 37.5% of families living below the poverty line and 56.0% of the population, including 69.2% of under eighteens and 100.0% of those over 64.

Education
Tulsita is served by the Pettus Independent School District.

References

External links
 Handbook of Texas Online article

Census-designated places in Bee County, Texas
Census-designated places in Texas